This page is a list of directors and ballet masters of the Théâtre de la Monnaie in Brussels.

After 1981, La Monnaie ceased to have Ballet masters, but took on choreographers in residence.

After 2007, La Monnaie ceased to take on choreographers in residence. Yet, Rosas and Anne Teresa De Keersmaeker continue to occupy an important part of La Monnaie's dance programme.

References 

 
 
Theatre-related lists
Lists of Belgian people by occupation
Brussels-related lists